The Vienna Ring Road (lit. ring road) is a 5.3 km (3.3 mi) circular grand boulevard that serves as a ring road around the historic Innere Stadt (Inner Town) district of Vienna, Austria. The road is located on sites where medieval city fortifications once stood, including high walls and the broad open field ramparts (glacis), criss-crossed by paths that lay before them. 

It was constructed after the dismantling of the city walls in the mid-19th century.

Because of its architectural beauty and history, the Vienna  has been called the "Lord of the Ring Roads" and is designated by UNESCO as part of Vienna's World Heritage Site.

History

This grand boulevard was built to replace the city walls, which had been built during the 13th century and funded by the ransom payment derived from the release of Richard the Lion Heart, Richard I of England, and reinforced as a consequence of the First Turkish Siege in 1529 and the Thirty Years' War in 1618. The walls were surrounded by a glacis about 500m wide, where buildings and vegetation were prohibited for military defensive reason. But by the late 18th century these fortifications had become obsolete. Under Emperor Joseph II, streets and walkways were built in the glacis, lit by lanterns and lined by trees. Craftsmen built open-air workshops, and stalls were set up. But the Revolution of 1848 was required to trigger a more significant change.

In 1850, the suburbs or Vorstädte (today the Districts II to IX) were incorporated into the municipality, which made the city walls an impediment to traffic. In 1857, Emperor Franz Joseph I of Austria issued the decree "I have resolved to command" (Es ist Mein Wille at Wikisource) ordering the demolition of the city walls and moats. In his decree, he laid out the exact size of the boulevard, as well as the geographical positions and functions of the new buildings. The Ringstraße and the planned buildings were intended to be a showcase for the grandeur and glory of the Habsburg Empire. On the practical level, Emperor Napoléon III of France's boulevard construction in Paris had already demonstrated how enlarging  and widening the size of streets effectively made the erection of revolutionary barricades difficult and thus an easier target for artillery.

Since the Ringstraße had always been meant primarily for show, a parallel Lastenstraße (cargo road) was built on the outside of the former glacis. This street is commonly known as 2-er Linie, named after the number "2" in the identifiers of the various streetcar or tram lines which used it. It is still an important traffic thoroughfare.

After some disputes about competence between the government and the municipality, a "City Extension Fund" was created, which was administered by the government. Only the city hall or town hall was planned by the city.

During the following years, a large number of opulent public and private buildings were erected. Both the nobility and the plutocracy rushed to build showy mansions  and palaces along the boulevard. One of the first buildings was the Heinrichshof, owned by the beer brewer Heinrich Drasche, which was located opposite the Imperial and Royal Court Opera House or opera house until 1945.

One of the earliest art historians to study the Ringstraße is Renate Wagner-Rieger, a professor and alumnus at the University of Vienna.

Famous admirers

 Sigmund Freud was known to take a daily recreational walk around the Ring.  
 Adolf Hitler was supposed to be a great admirer of the architecture of this area and that influenced Nazi architecture.

Buildings

Many of the buildings that line the Ringstraße date back to the time before 1870. The following are some of the more notable buildings:
 Vienna State Opera (formerly K.u.K. Hofoper) in neo-romantic style by August Sicard von Sicardsburg and Eduard van der Nüll
 Academy of Fine Arts Vienna
 Palace of Justice
 Austrian Parliament Building, in neo-attic style (a reference to the democracy of ancient Athens) by Theophil Freiherr von Hansen,
 Rathaus (Town Hall) in Flemish-gothic style by Friedrich Schmidt,
 Burgtheater (formerly K.u.K. Hofburgtheater) by Karl Freiherr von Hasenauer,
 University of Vienna, in neo-renaissance style (a reference to the beginnings of the university system in northern Italy),
 Votivkirche, in neo-gothic style (a reference to the gothic Cathedrals of France) by Heinrich Freiherr von Ferstel
 Wiener Börse (Vienna Stock Exchange)
 Urania observatory
 Österreichische Postsparkasse (Postal Savings Bank), in Jugendstil by Otto Wagner
 Museum für Angewandte Kunst (Museum of Applied Arts) in neo-renaissance style by Heinrich Freiherr von Ferstel
 Hotel Imperial (formerly Palais Württemberg)
 Palais Schey von Koromla
 Palais Ephrussi

The only sacred building on the boulevard is the Votivkirche, which was built in dedication after Emperor Franz Joseph had survived an assassination attempt in 1853.

The Winter Palace or Hofburg was extended by an annex, the Neue Hofburg (New Hofburg), which houses the Museum of Ethnology and the Austrian National Library today. On the other side of the boulevard, there are the Kunsthistorisches Museum (Museum of Art History) and the Naturhistorisches Museum (Museum of Natural History), which were built for the imperial collections. Originally, there should have been a parallel wing opposite the Neue Hofburg, which would have been located across the Ringstrasse from the Museum of Natural History. Together with the Heldenplatz and the Maria-Theresien-Platz this plan would have constituted the  Imperial Forum/Kaiserforum. However, that plan was shelved for lack of funds.

The construction ended only in 1913 with the completion of the Kriegsministerium (Imperial and Royal Ministry of War). At that time, the Ringstraßenstil was already somewhat outdated, as is shown by the Art Nouveau (Jugendstil) inspired Postsparkassengebäude (Postal Savings Society Building) by Otto Wagner opposite the ministry building, which was built at the same time.

The Ringstraße was also generously planned with green spaces and trees, the most notable parks being the Stadtpark with the Kursalon, Burggarten, Volksgarten, and Rathauspark, as well as a number of squares such as the Schwarzenbergplatz, Schillerplatz, Maria-Theresien-Platz and Heldenplatz. Dotted along the Ringstraße are various monuments. They include statues to Goethe, Schiller, Empress Maria Theresia, Prince Eugene of Savoy, Archduke Charles of Austria, the founders of the First Austrian Republic, Athena, Andreas von Liebenberg, Count Radetzky, Georg Coch, and Johann Strauss amongst many.

The biggest catastrophe was the fire of the Ringtheater in 1881, in which several hundred people died. It was subsequently demolished and replaced by the emperor's charity building, the Sühnhof, which was built in memory of the more than 300 victims, and inaugurated by Emperor Franz Joseph I. It was destroyed during the bombing of Vienna in 1945; today the municipal police-headquarters is there.

Other buildings that were destroyed or heavily damaged during World War II was the Opera House, the opposite building Heinrichshof which was replaced in the 1950s with the Kärtnerhof. The Urania observatory, the Kriegsministerium and the Parliament building were heavily damaged, and the Burgtheater burned down. The famous Hotel Metropole, which was located at the Franz-Joseph-Kai, was completely destroyed and replaced with a monument to the victims of Nazism.

Sections 

The Ringstraße has several sections. It surrounds the central area of Vienna on all sides, except for the northeast, where its place is taken by the Franz-Josephs-Kai, the street going along the Donaukanal (a branch of the Danube). Starting from the Ringturm at the northern end of the Franz-Josephs-Kai, the sections are:
 Schottenring (named after the Schottenstift)
 Universitätsring (university), formerly Dr.-Karl-Lueger-Ring (Karl Lueger)
 Dr.-Karl-Renner-Ring (Karl Renner), formerly Parlamentsring
 Burgring (Hofburg)
 Opernring (Vienna State Opera)
 Kärntner Ring (named after Kärntner Straße, the road that led south to Carinthia)
 Schubertring (Franz Schubert)
 Parkring (Wiener Stadtpark)
 Stubenring (named after the Stubenbastei fortification, part of Vienna's city walls since 1156)

See also 
 Vienna Beltway in the outer districts

Notes

External links 

 Ringstrasse Vienna, Map and Illustrated Guide
 The Ring in Vienna
 Map – Vienna, showing the Ring

1850s in the Austrian Empire
Innere Stadt
Ring roads
Streets in Vienna
Urban planning in Austria
Tourist attractions in Vienna
World Heritage Sites in Vienna